B. B. Lees (born March 1931) was the seventh head football coach for Eastern New Mexico University in Portales, New Mexico and he held that position for three seasons, from 1964 until 1966.  His overall coaching record at Eastern NMU was 9 wins, 18 losses, and 1 ties.  This ranks him eighth at Eastern NMU in terms of total wins and tenth at Eastern NMU in terms of winning percentage.

References

1931 births
Living people
Eastern New Mexico Greyhounds football coaches